Copper selenide is an inorganic binary compound consisting of copper and selenium. Its formula is sometimes described as CuSe or Cu2Se.

The crystalline structure and electronic behavior is determined by its elemental composition. Stoichiometric copper selenide is a zero bandgap material with metal-like behavior. Copper-deficient Cu2-xSe (non-stoichiometric) is an intrinsic p-type semiconductor with direct and indirect bandgap energies in the range of 2.1–2.3 eV and 1.2–1.4 eV, respectively. It is frequently grown as nanoparticles or other nanostructures.

Uses 
Copper selenide is produced in-situ to form a protective black coating on iron or steel parts in some cold-bluing processes. Bluing solutions that operate in this manner will typically be labeled as containing selenous acid or selenium dioxide. It has also been investigated for use in the treatment of colon cancer.

Natural occurrences
Copper selenides are the most common selenium minerals. CuSe is known in mineralogy as klockmannite, while Cu2Se occurs as two polymorphs, berzelianite (isometric, more common) and bellidoite (tetragonal). There are more natural Cu selenides to date, including umangite, Cu3Se2 and athabascaite, Cu5Se4.

See also 
 Gallium selenide
 Indium selenide
 Copper indium gallium selenide
 Copper sulfate
 Selenium dioxide
 Selenous acid

References 

Selenides
Copper compounds